Frederik Kiehn Clausen (born 29 July 1995) is a Danish handball player who plays for GOG Håndbold and the Danish national team. He has also played several matches for the Danish national junior and youth teams.

He made his international debut on the Danish national team on 20 June 2015 against Poland.

He also participated at the 2015 Men's Junior World Handball Championship in Brazil, placering 2nd.

Achievements
 Danish Handball League:
 Winner: 2022
 Runners-up: 2019, 2020
 Danish Handball Cup:
 Winner: 2019, 2022
 Finalist: 2021

References

1995 births
Living people
Danish male handball players
People from Svendborg